Lissospira conica is a species of sea snail, a marine gastropod mollusk in the family Skeneidae.

Description
The height of the shell attains 2 mm, its diameter 1.7 mm.

Distribution
This particular species occurs in the Atlantic Ocean off Georgia, USA, at a depth of 538 m.

References

conica
Gastropods described in 1927